{| align=right border=1 cellspacing=0 cellpadding=4 class=toccolours width=300 style="margin: 0 0 1em 1em; border-collapse: collapse; border: 1px #aaa solid"
|+ style="margin-left: inherit; font-size: larger;" | Cadereyta de Montes, Querétaro, Mexico
|-
|bgcolor=#E8E7DB| Location || 
|-
|bgcolor=#E8E7DB| Municipal president || Enrrique Bolaños  2018-2021 (AN)
|-
|bgcolor=#E8E7DB| Surface ||  
|-
|bgcolor=#E8E7DB| Population (2005) || 57,204
|-
|bgcolor=#E8E7DB| HDI (2000) || 0.7074
|-
|bgcolor=#E8E7DB| Time zone (UTC) || -6 UTC CST
|-
|bgcolor=#E8E7DB| GDP (per capita) (2000) || US$3,112
|-
| align="center" colspan="2" |
{| style="background: none;"
|align="center"|Official website: 
|}
|}Cadereyta de Montes' is a city and municipality in Querétaro, Mexico. The municipality is the second most extensive in the state.
thumb|200px|left|Churches in the center of the city of Cadereyta
The city was founded in 1640, and received its current name in two stages: first in 1642 in honor of Viceroy Don Lope Díez de Armendáriz, marqués de Cadereyta, and then in 1904 after the lawyer Ezequiel Montes. From its conception during the Spanish rule of Mexico, the city was intended to become quite important. It received the status of Alcaldía mayor in 1689, thus becoming the dominant city in this part of the state. It was a post from which the main trade routes were defended from attacks by the indigenous people of the Sierra Gorda.

A famous greenhouse called Finca Schmoll'' is in the city, preserving a large collection of desert plants open to the public.

The population of the municipality grew from 51,688 in 2000 to 57,204 in 2005.

External links
Cadereyta de Montes 
Cadereyta de Montes 
Encyclopedia of the municipalities of Mexico 

Populated places in Querétaro
Pueblos Mágicos
1640 establishments in New Spain